Mainz-Kastel station is situated on the Frankfurt–Wiesbaden line (line number 3603; timetable section 645.1) in Mainz-Kastel, now a suburb of Wiesbaden, in the German state of Hesse. It was opened as part of the Taunus Railway, which was opened in 1839/40. The station was opened as part of the last stage of construction of the line to Wiesbaden and was opened on 19 May 1840.

Kastel station is also served by the Regionalbahn service running between Neuwied and Frankfurt (RB 10) every hour. In the rush hour it extends to a half-hourly service.

Buses 
The following lines of ESWE and MVG serve the station (bus station Brückenkopf): 6, 6A, 9, 28, 54, 55, 56, 57, 68, 91, 99.

Notes

Rhine-Main S-Bahn stations
Railway stations in Wiesbaden
Railway stations in Germany opened in 1840